"Dance with Me" is a song by American R&B singer Debelah Morgan, released on June 19, 2000, as the first single from Morgan's third studio album of the same name. Morgan co-wrote the song with its producer Giloh Morgan, with Richard Adler and Jerry Ross receiving songwriting credits for the reworking of their composition "Hernando's Hideaway". Lyrically, "Dance with Me" revolves around the protagonist's declaration that she only wants to dance with her lover that night.

The song peaked at number eight on the US Billboard Hot 100 chart on January 6, 2001. The single also reached number three in Australia—where it was certified platinum for sales exceeding 70,000 copies—and number 10 in Romania and the United Kingdom. "Dance with Me" received international acclaim and has been performed in different versions, including a special Walt Disney version and a Spanish version entitled "Baila Conmigo".

Track listings

US CD and cassette single
 "Dance with Me" (album version) – 3:42
 "Dance with Me" (Soul Central mix) – 4:10
 "Dance with Me" (Boom Boom remix) – 3:55

US 7-inch single
A. "Dance with Me" (album version) – 3:41
B. "Dance with Me" (Soul Central mix) – 4:07

European CD single
 "Dance with Me" (album version) – 3:42
 "Dance with Me" (JP radio mix) – 3:34

UK and Australian CD single
 "Dance with Me" (album version) – 3:42
 "Dance with Me" (Soul Central mix) – 4:10
 "Dance with Me" (Boom Boom remix) – 3:55
 "Dance with Me" (JP radio mix) – 3:34
 "Dance with Me" (Jack & Jill edit) – 3:44

Credits and personnel
Credits are lifted from the European CD single liner notes.

Studios
 Recorded at HITTOWN Studios (New York City), A to Z/Bazzbo Studios (La Verne, California, US), and the Masters Crib (Canyon Country, California, US)
 Mixed at the Hit Factory (New York City)
 Mastered at Sterling Sound (New York City)

Personnel

 Richard Adler – writing
 Jerry Ross – writing
 Debelah Morgan – writing, lead vocals, background vocals, production, vocal arrangement
 Giloh Morgan – writing, background vocals, drum programming, all keyboards, production, vocal arrangement, recording
 Darrell Crooks – guitar
 Bashiri Johnson – percussion
 Scott Lovelis – recording
 "Bonzai" Jimi Caruso – mixing
 Chuck Bailey – mixing assistant
 Michael McCoy – mixing assistant
 Dan Milazzo – mixing assistant
 Greg Calbi – mastering
 David Sonenberg – executive production
 Scot McCracken – executive production
 Andrea Brooks – art direction and design
 Roy Zipstein – photography

Charts

Weekly charts

Year-end charts

Certifications

Release history

References

2000 singles
2000 songs
Atlantic Records singles
Debelah Morgan songs
Songs about dancing
Songs written by Jerry Ross (composer)
Songs written by Richard Adler